The 2004 Illinois State Redbirds football team represented Illinois State University as a member of the Gateway Football Conference during the 2004 NCAA Division I-AA football season. Led by fifth-year head coach Denver Johnson, the Redbirds compiled an overall record of 4–7 with a mark of 2–5 in conference play, placing in a three-way tie for fifth in the Gateway. Illinois State played home games at Hancock Stadium in Normal, Illinois.

Schedule

References

Illinois State
Illinois State Redbirds football seasons
Illinois State Redbirds football